Christopher R. Wing (born May 28, 1971) is a former American football linebacker who played for the New York Jets of the National Football League (NFL). He played college football at Boise State University.

References 

1971 births
Living people
American football linebackers
Boise State Broncos football players
New York Jets players